Fort Wright is a home rule-class city in Kenton County, Kentucky, in the United States. The population was 5,723 at the 2010 census. It is part of the Cincinnati metropolitan area.

Geography
Fort Wright is located in northern Kenton County at  (39.051011, -84.535042). It is bordered to the north by Ludlow, to the northeast by Park Hills, to the east by Kenton Vale, to the east and southeast by Covington, to the southwest by Edgewood and Crestview Hills, and to the west by Fort Mitchell. Interstate 75/71 crosses the center of the city, with access from Exit 189 (Kyles Lane). The freeway leads northeast  to downtown Cincinnati in Ohio and southwest  to its split at Walton.

History
The area that is now Fort Wright was the site of one of the Civil War fortifications built for the Defense of Cincinnati. The city, incorporated in 1941, was named for Major General Horatio Gouverneur Wright, a Union Army engineer.

It annexed the neighboring communities of Lookout Heights in 1937, South Hills in 1949 and Lakeview in 1960.

Demographics

At the 2000 census, there were 5,681 people, 2,430 households and 1,569 families residing in the city. The racial makeup of the city was 97.32% White, 0.99% African American, 0.05% Native American, 0.79% Asian, 0.02% Pacific Islander, 0.21% from other races, and 0.62% from two or more races. Hispanic or Latino of any race were 0.69% of the population.

There were 2,430 households, of which 25.9% had children under the age of 18 living with them, 52.8% were married couples living together, 8.7% had a female householder with no husband present, and 35.4% were non-families. 30.9% of all households were made up of individuals, and 10.5% had someone living alone who was 65 years of age or older. The average household size was 2.34 and the average family size was 2.97.

21.5% were under the age of 18, 7.5% from 18 to 24, 30.9% from 25 to 44, 24.6% from 45 to 64, and 15.5% who were 65 years of age or older. The median age was 39 years. For every 100 females, there were 94.4 males. For every 100 females age 18 and over, there were 89.8 males.

The median household income was $52,394, and the median family income was $62,464. Males had a median income of $46,736 versus $35,220 for females. The per capita income for the city was $27,448. About 3.9% of families and 3.9% of the population were below the poverty line, including 6.1% of those under age 18 and 2.6% of those age 65 or over.

Education
Most of Fort Wright is in the Kenton County School District. Portions are in the Beechwood Independent School District and the Covington Independent School District and the

References

External links
 Official website

Cities in Kentucky
Cities in Kenton County, Kentucky